The Ancient and Auspicious Order of the Nine Gems was established in 1851 by King Mongkut (Rama IV) of the Kingdom of Siam (now Thailand). The order is bestowed upon the members of the Thai royal family and distinguished high-ranking officials who have given service to the kingdom and who are active Buddhist laypeople. In practice, it is the highest Thai order granted to Thai citizens, as the two higher orders are reserved for royalty or foreign heads of state. Members of the order are entitled to use the postnominals น.ร.

History
The order is based on the model of European orders of chivalry and merit. The nine gems are the Thai form of the original Hindu royal amulet known as the navaratna and in its original form consisted of a ring of gold bearing the nine gems awarded to a Thai general after he won an important military victory and is also part of the royal insignia given the Thai king at his coronation.  This ring still is part of the insignia of the order and worn by the male members of the order. The nine precious stones of the royal amulet constitute an integral part of both the badge and the star of the order.

The nine gems and the corresponding benefits that they bestow on their bearers are:

Diamond—Power, wealth, success over enemies
Ruby—Success and longevity
Emerald—Strength and security
Yellow Sapphire—Charm and love
Garnet—Health and longevity
Blue Sapphire—Love and wealth
Pearl/Moonstone—Purity, happiness, and success over enemies
Zircon/Topaz—Wealth and success in legal affairs
Cat's Eye—Protection by spirits, and from fire

Insignia

The decoration consists of a single class (knight). The insignia are: 
Pendant of the Nine Gems, on a yellow sash with red, blue, and green trim, worn over the right shoulder to the left hip (for men). For women, the Pendant of the Nine Gems is attached to a silk ribbon, worn on the front left shoulder.
Star of the Nine Gems, to wear on the left breast.
Gold Ring of the Nine Gems, for men, to wear on the right index finger.
The Sovereign Grand Master of the Order is Knight but added the Chain of the Nine Gems sash above to wear over the right shoulder to the left hip above sash badge and the star is decorated with diamonds.

List of Sovereigns

List of recipients

  Highlights indicate living members

Royal Knights

Royal Dames

Knights

Living recipients of the order

References

External links
 The Ancient and Auspicious Order of the Nine Gems, Secretariat to the Cabinet of Thailand

Nine Gems, Order Of The
1851 establishments in Siam
Gemstones in religion
Awards established in 1851